Generals is the second studio album by the indie pop band The Mynabirds. It was released by Saddle Creek Records on June 5, 2012 and produced by Richard Swift. The album's title was inspired by Richard Avedon's photograph "Generals of the Daughters of the American Revolution".

Track listing
All songs written by Laura Burhenn, except where noted.

Reception

On Metacritic, Generals has an average score of 79 out of 100, indicating "generally favorable reviews".

Eric Harvey, writing for Pitchfork, praised the album as "a stylistically diverse collection of openhearted, politically engaged pop", adding that Burhenn succeeds in "translating [her] deeply held political conventions into good tunes". In a similarly positive review for Consequence of Sound, Tony Hardy also comments on the political nature of the lyrics, stating that Burhenn "juxtaposes the privileged, regal ladies of Avedon’s portrait with those she considers to be true daughters of the revolution, the likes, say, of Rosa Parks or Naomi Wolf." Drake Baer of Paste described Generals as "[Burhenn's] militant, heartfelt, frustrated pacifism [...] set into pop convention".

References

External links 
 Generals on Allmusic

2012 albums
The Mynabirds albums
Albums produced by Richard Swift (singer-songwriter)
Saddle Creek Records albums